Suraj Singh Rawa is an Indian politician from the Bharatiya Janata Party and a member of the Rajasthan Legislative Assembly representing the pushkar Vidhan Sabha constituency of Rajasthan.

References 

Living people
Members of the Rajasthan Legislative Assembly
Bharatiya Janata Party politicians from Rajasthan
1980 births